Pitunugama is a village in Sri Lanka. It is located within Central Province and a locality in the city of Kandy. Pitunugama is also known as "Chandi Wattha"  which translates as  Land of Braves.

See also
List of towns in Central Province, Sri Lanka

External links

Populated places in Kandy District